Luka Ćelović also known as Luka Ćelović-Trebinjac (18 October 1854 in Pridvorci, near Trebinje – 15 August 1929 in Belgrade) was a Serbian businessman, merchant and rentier. At the beginning of the 20th century, he was one of the most influential people in Serbia, a patriot and a great benefactor, also a philanthropist of education. He was the first president of the Belgrade Cooperative. In 1902, with Milorad Gođevac, he founded the Serbian Chetnik Organization in Belgrade.

Biography
He finished his grammar school in Trebinje, Banja Luka and Brčko, and after basic education, he was denied higher education by Turkish authorities. Instead of languishing there he left Bosnia and Hercegovina in 1872 for Belgrade, where Archimandrite Nićifor Dučić, a family friend, found him a job as an apprentice in then famous store held by Radosavljević & Ignjatijević.

Three years later, when Herzegovina Uprising (1875-1878) began, Ćelović went back to his native Hercegovina as a volunteer soldier. In combat against Turks he was wounded, but soon recovered and continued to fight. When Serbia declared war on the Ottoman Empire, volunteers from Hercegovina went back to Belgrade, thus Luka continued combating in both Serbo–Turkish wars.

After the war, with the support of his countrymen, Trieste traders Aleksa Krsmanović and Rista Parnanos, Ćelović started his own business as an independent merchant, selling plums, corn, wheat, and pigs.

In 1882 he established the Belgrade Cooperative, whose main goal was to help the middle-class traders and artists by providing soft loans and avoiding loan sharks. In 1899 Ćelović was elected as President of the Board of the Belgrade Cooperative. Self-taught, with a hard work ethic he made the Belgrade Cooperative one of the strongest Serbian financial institutions.
 
Ćelović also did a lot to help the weaker member of society, founding the Committee for the Protection of the Blind Girls in Belgrade.
 
Although he had a rudimentary education himself, his concern for the development of science and education was remarkable. It stemmed from the period of his life, during which he was part of the Chetnik movement, when he became closely connected with Milorad Gođevac, general Jovan Atanacković  and the students from Old Serbia (now Macedonia), leading him to the lifelong conviction that education was the basis of the Serbian future. That and other reasons resulted in his making the University of Belgrade the sole beneficiary of his fortune when he died.

Printing of the Glasnik Hemijskog Drustva Beograd (Bulletin of the Chemical Society) with Nikola A. Pušin as editor and chief, was enabled thanks to financial assistance from the Luka Ćelović-Trebinje Fund.

Milorad Gođevac, impressed by the success of the Bulgarian agents and četnici in converting the Macedonian Slavs to Bulgarian nationalism, proposed a similar plan of action by Serbia. In 1902 a group of Serbian nationalists, headed by Luka Ćelović and Milorad Gođevac, organized the Executive Committee of the Serbian Chetnik Organization. Ćelović himself gave generous sums from his very considerable savings to the organization. A Committee (Komitski odbor) was organized at Vranje with branches at Leskovac and Niš. Serbia's government for a time discouraged this private action but educators and teachers who suffered at the hands of the Bulgars thought otherwise and eventually impressed upon the government and prevailed.

Apart from being a successful businessman, Ćelović was also supportive of common welfare, he and Dr. Milorad Gođevac, a Belgrade physician, were funding troops to fight for Old Serbia. The Bulgarian committee noticed the danger in such actions and sentenced Ćelović and Gođevac to death in absentia. An assassin was sent by them to Serbia, but he never made it to Belgrade.

Ćelović was indirectly linked with Serbian combat in Macedonian Struggle, by financially helping troops to organize. In fact, Dr. Gođevac established a society which financially aided and recruited men for what became known as the "Četnik Campaign." The first president was Luka Ćelović and the other leaders of the campaign were Vasa Jovanović, Ljubomir Kovačević, Žika Rafajlović and Nikola Spasić. The men solicited for the cause, and Luka Ćelović donated the enormous sum of 50,000 dinars annually to the Četnik Campaign.

Investing in Belgrade's Architectural Heritage
Ćelović founded the Belgrade Cooperative and funded the construction of this extravagant and extraordinary building. His memory is best embodied by the buildings that now define Savamala, without him Savamala, as it is now would not exist. His investment in the quarter regenerated this once squalid and frequently flooded market district. Ćelović built his home on "Kraljević Marko" Street as well as building the palatial Belgrade Cooperative, now known as Geozavod, and considered one of the most beautiful buildings in Belgrade, the work of architects Andra Stevanović and Nikola Nestorović. The magnificent Hotel Bristol, near Park Bristol and Park Luka Ćelović is the other gem in the Savamala neighborhood. The buildings are his only real legacy, and their combination of using new architectural techniques and promoting Serbian Baroque and Art Nouveau in Belgrade show Ćelović to be a true visionary.

Donator
In his will, after passing away, Ćelović left almost all of his property to the University of Belgrade. Besides, he has founded an endowment named "A Foundation of Luka Ćelović – Trebinjac"

See also
 Đorđe Vajfert
 Miša Anastasijević
 Nikola Spasić
 Stanojlo Petrović
 Marija Trandafil
 Sava Tekelija
 Sava Vukovic (merchant)

References

External links
Mira Sofronijević: Luka Ćelović - Trebinjac, the biggest contributor to University of Belgrade 
 
My hero Luka Ćelović (1854-1929), a patriot and a benefactor 

1854 births
1929 deaths
People from Trebinje
Serbs of Bosnia and Herzegovina
Businesspeople from Belgrade
Serbian philanthropists
Serbian Chetnik Organization
19th-century Serbian people
20th-century Serbian people
People of the Kingdom of Yugoslavia
Emigrants from the Ottoman Empire to Serbia